This is a list of seasons completed by the Oklahoma City Yard Dawgz. The Yard Dawgz were a professional arena football franchise based in Oklahoma City, Oklahoma. The team was established in 2004. They played in the AF2 from 2004 to 2009 and in the Arena Football League in 2010. They made the playoffs five times.

References
General
 
 

Arena Football League seasons by team
 
Oklahoma sports-related lists